A Tiempo is Spanish for "on time". It may refer to:

 A Tiempo (Gian Marco album), 2002 studio album by Gian Marco
 A Tiempo (Ha*Ash album), 2011 studio album by Ha*Ash

See also 
 A Tiempo de Rock, a 1983 album by the band Sombrero Verde
 Tiempo (disambiguation)